Vladislav Kodola (born 30 October 1996) is a Belarusian ice hockey player for HC Dynamo Moscow in the Kontinental Hockey League (KHL) and the Belarusian national team.

On 17 June 2022, Kodola left his original club, Severstal Cherepovets, after seven seasons as he was traded to Dynamo Moscow in exchange for Alexander Petunin.

He represented Belarus at the 2021 IIHF World Championship.

References

External links

1996 births
Living people
Belarusian expatriate ice hockey people
Belarusian expatriate sportspeople in Canada
Belarusian expatriate sportspeople in Russia
Belarusian expatriate sportspeople in the United States
Belarusian ice hockey centres
HC Dynamo Moscow players
HC Izhstal players
Saginaw Spirit players
Sarnia Sting players
Severstal Cherepovets players
Sportspeople from Gomel